OKK Koksovny, a.s. (former names OKD, OKK, a.s. and Ostravsko-karvinské koksovny, akciová společnost) is the largest producer of foundry coke in Europe. The Company operates one plant in the City of Ostrava - called 'Svoboda' facility.

History 
The production of coke in the Ostrava area dates back to the 1840s. In 1843 a coking plant named "Jan" (later renamed "President Beneš" and then "Czechoslovak Army" was founded.  It was later to become a part of OKK. In 1952 the company OKK was founded and all operating coking plants were merged under one head office, having previously existed as separate state enterprises, except for the metallurgical coking plants (in the Ostrava quarter Vítkovice, in the cities of Třinec and Kladno, and the coking plant Nová Huť [New Smelting Works] founded in the same year). OKK included the coking plants in Ostrava: Svoboda, Jan Šverma, Karolina, Trojice, Czechoslovak army, and Lazy.

In 1994 the joint-stock company OKD, OKK was established on 1 January 1994 by the allocation of OKD, a. s. assets. It became a wholly owned subsidiary of OKD, a. s. The annual turnover of the company was around CZK 5.5 billion. The new enterprise was created by merging two mining coking plants located within the city of Ostrava and one more plant located in the Karviná region.

In 2008 after property changes the New World Resources Plc Company ("NWR") became a new owner of the OKD, OKK, a.s. NWR was also the owner of the OKD, a.s., a hard coal mining company.

Currently (2011) the OKK Koksovny, a.s. operates only one coking plant called 'Svoboda' facility.

Company products 

The main business of OKK Koksovny, a. s. is the production of coke. The company produces coke from virtually all types of coal suitable for coking. Coal is sourced from OKD mines as well as from abroad.

OKK Koksovny, a. s. is the largest European producer of foundry coke. The firm offers a broad assortment of coke types for foundry and metallurgical manufacturing, for special metallurgy, heating and other purposes. It also sells chemical products from the high-temperature coal carbonisation that takes place during the coking process.

Production 
(Data from 2010)

Achieved annual production of 1,005,500 tonnes of coke. Of that

 0.277 million tonnes was foundry coke
 0.524 million tonnes was blast furnace coke
 0.204 million tonnes was fuel and technological coke

The coking process yields a number of by-products that are important input materials in the chemical industry. Coal gas is captured during the coking process, with individual chemicals subsequently separated from the gas.

OKK Koksovny, a.s. offers its customers:

 Coke-oven gas
 Tar
 Benzol
 Ammonium sulphate
 Solid sulphur

In 2010, OKK Koksovny a. s., produced:

 408 mil. m3 of coke-oven gas
 31,500 tonnes of anhydrous tar
 11,000 tonnes of raw benzol
 7,300  tonnes of ammonium sulphate
 800 tonnes of sulphur

See also

 Energy in the Czech Republic

Electric power companies of the Czech Republic